The Cacahuatique Mountains are a mountain range and hilly area of eastern El Salvador. Coffee production plays an important role in the economy, particularly by the Ciudad Barrios Cooperative which, as of 2003, was producing approximately 3800 tonnes (8.5 million pounds) of coffee annually in Cacahuatique.

References

Mountains of El Salvador
Mountain ranges of Central America